Mazzuoli is an Italian surname.

Giuseppe Mazzuoli (c. 1536 – 1589), Renaissance painter known as il Bastaruolo
Andrea Mazzuoli (born February 15, 1992) is an Italian football defender.
Giovanni Mazzuoli (also Giovanni degli Organi) (ca. 1360 – 14 May 1426) was an Italian composer and organist of the late medieval and early Renaissance.

Italian-language surnames